Thaumetopoeinae is a subfamily of moths in the family Notodontidae. This group is sometimes treated as a family Thaumetopoeidae with three subfamilies: Thaumetopoeinae, Anaphinae and Epicominae. However, it is now commonly treated at subfamily rank based on morphological and molecular phylogenetic evidence.

This explains why the name is sometimes spelled Thaumatopoeinae, incorrectly from the taxonomic standpoint, but in accordance with etymology.

The larval stage of some Thaumetopoeinae are known as processionary caterpillars, so named because they move in columns in search of food, resembling a procession. Some of the species, like the pine and oak processionaries, can constitute a health hazard due to their urticating hairs.

Genera and some species
Aglaosoma
Aglaosoma variegata
Axiocleta
Cynosarga
Epicoma
Epicoma contristis
Epicoma melanospila
Epicoma melanosticta
Epicoma tristis
Mesodrepta
Ochrogaster
Tanystola
Thaumetopoea
Trichiocercus
Trichiocercus sparshalli

See also 
 Comparison of butterflies and moths
 Ochrogaster lunifer, an Australian processionary caterpillar

References

Thaumetopoeinae
Notodontidae